Thiolactic acid is the organosulfur compound with the formula HSCH2CO2H.  The molecule contains both carboxylic acid and thiol functional groups.  It is structurally related to lactic acid by the interchange of SH for OH.  It is a colorless oil.

Thiolactic acid was once widely used in hair permanent waving formulations, but has been displaced by formulations based on thioglycolic acid. Instead of using the acid itself, its salts are used.  It is now mainly used for depilation.

See also
 Hydroxybutyric acid
 3-Mercaptopropionic acid

References

Carboxylic acids
Thiols